The Brass Project is an album by English saxophonist John Surman with a brass section conducted by John Warren. It was recorded in 1992 and released on the ECM label.

Reception
The Allmusic review by Scott Yanow awarded the album 4½ stars, stating, "This episodic set has its share of sound explorations but also contains swinging sections and an impressive amount of excitement. The colorful solos (mostly by Surman) and the unpredictable writing make this a highly recommended disc".

Track listing
All compositions by John Surman except where noted.
 "The Returning Exile" – 7:46   
 "Coastline" – 3:38   
 "The New One Two Part 1" (John Warren) – 6:38   
 "The New One Two Part 2" (Warren) – 7:33   
 "Spacial Motive" (Warren) – 4:56   
 "Wider Vision" – 8:33   
 "Silent Lake" (Warren) – 6:01   
 "Mellstock Quire / Tantrum Clangley" (Warren) – 11:19   
 "All for a Shadow" (Surman, Warren) 5:35

Personnel
John Surman – soprano saxophone, baritone saxophone, bass clarinet, alto clarinet, piano
Henry Lowther, Stephen Waterman, Stuart Brooks – trumpet
Malcolm Griffiths, Chris Pyne – trombone
David Stewart, Richard Edwards – bass trombone
Chris Laurence – bass
John Marshall – drums, percussion
John Warren – conductor

References

ECM Records albums
John Surman albums
1993 albums
Albums produced by Manfred Eicher